The fifth generation of the BMW 7 Series consists of the BMW F01 (sedan version) and BMW F02 (long-wheelbase sedan version) full-size luxury sedans. The F01/F02 generation was produced by BMW from 2008 to 2015 and is often collectively referred to as the F01.

The F01 was the first BMW vehicle to be available with a hybrid drivetrain, an 8-speed automatic transmission and a turbocharged V12 engine. It was the second 7 Series to be available with a turbocharged petrol engine (the first being the European E23 745i), and all-wheel drive (xDrive). The wheelbase was increased by 8 cm over the outgoing 7 Series. Other model codes used for this generation were F03 for the "High Security 7 Series" armoured car and F04 for the "ActiveHybrid 7" hybrid-electric model.

In July 2015, the BMW 7 Series (G11) began production as the successor to the F01.

Development and launch 
The car's exterior was designed by Lebanese automotive designer Karim Habib. The styling retained some elements from its E65 7 Series predecessor but was a less controversial approach. The headlamps were reminiscent to the E65 but were smaller and sleeker. The car incorporated a wider and bigger kidney grille that went deeper into the front apron for a more aggressive appearance.

The car was first revealed to the public in the Red Square in Moscow (Russia) on 8 July 2008. Other launch events included the Paris Motor Show in October and the Los Angeles International Auto Show in November.

Equipment
The F01 was available with rear-wheel steering (Integral Active Steering), all-wheel drive (xDrive), eight speed automatic transmission, pedestrian recognition for the night vision feature, blind spot monitoring, massage function for the rear seats and the radar cruise control system was now able to completely stop the car and accelerate from a standstill (Active Cruise Control with Stop and Go).

Side cameras were fitted in the front bumper to assist with merging and exiting narrow spaces. By combining these cameras with the front and rear cameras, the F01 can display a virtual overhead graphic of the car to assist with parking. The instrument cluster has an LCD backdrop (with the gauge needles and rings still present as physical objects), allowing various graphics to be shown. A lane departure warning system - as fitted to the E60 5 Series since 2007 - was also available for the first time in a 7 Series.

Departures from the non-traditional interior design of the E65 include the transmission shifter being relocated to the centre console (previously a stalk on the steering column) and the seat controls being relocated to the outside edge of the seat base (previously located in the centre console).

Engines 

Official specifications are as follows.

Petrol engines 

* Top speed is electronically limited.
** The V12 engine for the F01 760i/Li was redesigned as a twin-turbocharged 6.0L (codenamed N74) in order to maintain a performance advantage over the 750i, which utilised a turbocharged V8 engine. In some markets, the V12 engine was only available in the long-wheelbase model.

Diesel engines 

* Top speed is electronically limited.

Special Models

High Security (F03) 

The 750Li High Security and 760Li High Security models are the first cars to be certified with BRV 2009 and VR7 ballistics protection ratings. Due to the added weight of the security upgrades, suspension components such as the shock absorbers and strut tops were upgraded. Options included an intercom system between the passengers and the driver, an alarm, a fire extinguisher with temperature sensor, irritant gas sensors (to warn of dangerous gasses in the passenger area), a fresh-air supply system and a compartment for two machine guns in the centre console.

The High Security models were unveiled in GPEC 2012.

ActiveHybrid 7 (F04) (2010–2015) 

The ActiveHybrid 7 was the first BMW vehicle to use a hybrid drivetrain. The concept was unveiled as the Concept 7 Series ActiveHybrid at the 2008 Paris Motor Show and the 2008 Los Angeles International Auto Show. The production version was unveiled at the 2009 Frankfurt Auto Show, and shown again later at the Monaco Yacht Show 2010.

The electric motor is integrated into the transmission housing, replacing the alternator and the starter. The battery is a lithium-ion type and located under the boot floor. Other features include an auto start/stop system. and an 8-speed automatic transmission. The hybrid system was based on the 2-mode hybrid from Daimler AG. The regenerative braking unit includes 12 V Absorbent Glass Mat batteries, running in parallel to a 120 V electrical network for electric motor. BMW claims it improved fuel consumption and reduced emissions by 15% over the non-hybrid model.

The car's exterior profile was designed by Karim Habib, Team Leader, Advanced Design for BMW in Munich, Germany.

The contemporary 740i was powered by a conventional petrol engine (the turbocharged N54 six-cylinder). The 740i has  less weight than the 750i over the front axle.

In late 2012, the ActiveHybrid 7's powertrain was significantly changed, switching from the 750i's turbocharged 4.4 litre V8 engine to the turbocharged 3.0 litre six-cylinder engine from the 740i. The 2012–2015 ActiveHybrid 7 was only available as a long-wheelbase model. Fuel economy was significantly improved for the updated drivetrain, which was rated at  city and  highway.

Alpina B7 

The Alpina B7 is based on the 750i and began production for the 2011 model year. The vehicle was unveiled in 2010 Chicago Auto Show, and went on sale in Spring of 2010. Production version went on sale as 2011 model year vehicle. The Alpina B7's engine is assembled by hand at Alpina's facility in Buchloe, Germany, before being shipped to BMW for installation, and the assembled vehicle is then sent back to Alpina for finishing touches.

Compared with the regular N63 engine, the Alpina variant includes high-performance pistons, strengthened cylinder heads, an additional radiator and external coolers for the engine oil and transmission oil. The F01/F02 B7 marks the first time that BMW M and Alpina used the same type of forced-induction for their engines; Alpina's engine has less horsepower but more torque than the S63 variant used in the F10 M5.

The transmission is a ZF 6HP26 6-speed automatic with heavy-duty gears, and the B7 includes a strengthened drive shaft, differential and rear axles. The B7 also features a choice of regular or long-wheelbase and/or rear-wheel drive or xDrive.

In late 2012, the B7 received a mid-life update in line with other models of the 7 Series. The updated B7 was unveiled at the Pebble Beach Concours d'Elegance in August 2012 and went on-sale immediately thereafter.

In North America, the BMW Alpina B7 is officially sold by BMW and have BMW VINs, whereas the Alpina B7 BiTurbo sold in Europe and Japan are sold as vehicles manufactured by Alpina.

Prince Albert II limousine 
In 2011, a limited production (200 units) version of BMW 7 Series limousines were supplied by BMW for the wedding of Albert II, Prince of Monaco, and Charlene Wittstock. The car was based on the 740Li.

Transmissions 
The F01 was produced with the following transmissions:
 6-speed automatic ZF 6HP19
 6-speed automatic ZF 6HP26
 8-speed automatic ZF 8HP70
 8-speed automatic ZF 8HP90

All models from 2009 through 2012 were equipped with the 6-speed automatic transmission with Steptronic function, except for the 760i/Li which had the 8-speed automatic transmission with Steptronic. For the 2013-15 model years, all the other models received the 8-speed automatic transmission with Steptronic.

Model year changes 
Most changes occur in September each year, when the changes for the following model year go into production, as is typical BMW practice. Therefore, the changes for 2009 represent the 2010 model year, for example:

2008 
 Launch model range consists of petrol models 740i, 750i and 750Li, and the diesel 730d.

2009 
 All-wheel drive becomes available for a 7 Series for the first time, in the form of the 750i xDrive and 750Li models.
 The V12-engined 760i/Li flagship models are added to the range.
 740d model introduced in autumn.
 M Sport Package introduced.
 Sales begin in the United States, initially with the 750i and 750Li models.
 Long-wheelbase 730Li model goes on sale, for Asian markets only.

2010 
 ActiveHybrid 7 and ActiveHybrid 7L models introduced. These initial hybrid models use a turbocharged 4.4 litre V8 engine with a  electric motor.
 740d xDrive model introduced in September 2010. 
 Optional comfort seats in the rear compartment are now also available in a three-seat version.
 Alpina B7 (rear-wheel drive) and B7X (all-wheel drive) models introduced.
 740i and 740Li models become available in the United States, the first six-cylinder 7-Series to be sold in the United States since 1992.

2013 facelift 
The F01 facelift (also known as LCI) models began production in July 2012 and were sold as the 2013 model year cars. The facelift models were unveiled at the 2012 Pebble Beach Concours d'Elegance, and shown at the 2012 Monaco Yacht Show.

Changes include:
 8-speed automatic transmission becomes standard equipment.
 ActiveHybrid 7 model switches from N63 V8 engine to N55 six-cylinder engine, and a more powerful electric motor was used.
 750i/Li and Alpina B7 engine upgraded from N63 to N63TU (N63B44O1), which added variable valve lift ("Valvetronic").
 740i/Li engine upgraded from N54 to N55, which added variable valve lift ("Valvetronic") and switched to a single twin-scroll turbocharger.
 740i/Li became available with all-wheel drive (xDrive).
 750d/Ld model introduced, powered by the triple-turbo N57S six-cylinder diesel engine.
 730i model discontinued.
 Full-LED headlamps.
 Revised kidney grille and front spoiler.
 Upgrade of the LCD dashboard's graphics ("Full Black Panel Display") and the gauge needles are now shown electronically, replacing the traditional physical needles. The information available to be displayed on the dashboard was increased.
 Self-levelling air suspension at the rear became standard.
 Night vision upgraded to include an automatic spotlight which targets pedestrians, to warn the driver about their presence ("Dynamic Light Spot").
 Automatic parking, where the car steers itself to parallel park ("BMW Parking Assistant").
 Driver drowsiness detection ("Attention Assistant") added.
 Collision avoidance system ("Active Protection") including collision detection, automatic pre-crash braking and automatic post-crash braking.
 Cruise control mode added for traffic jams ("Enhanced Active Cruise Control").

2013 
 760i/760Li models become compliant with the Euro 6 emissions standard.
 For the USA only, fifteen "V-12 25th Anniversary Edition" cars were produced, to commemorating the 25th anniversary of BMW's V12 engines. The cars are based on the 760Li and include various exterior styling and interior options. The RRP for the model was $159,695.

Pre-facelift styling

Post-facelift styling

Production 

The 740i and 740Li made up 10% of overall 7 Series sales in the United States, while the 760Li had 2%. In the United States, 70% of the 7 Series cars sold are the "L" long-wheelbase models.

Marketing 
For the tenth anniversary of the Tate Modern, BMW provided Spanish artist Martí Anson with a 7 Series in which to chauffeur artists to the gallery, with the car parked in the gallery's Turbine Hall during the exhibition.

BMW Group Russia provided vehicles for opening night premieres for various plays at the Bolshoi Theatre from 2004. In 2011, twenty vehicles (consisting of F01 7 Series and the F07 5 Series GT) were provided for the re-opening of the theatre's historical stage.

References

Notes

Bibliography

 

F01
7 Series (F01)
2010s cars
Cars introduced in 2008
Limousines